The South Link Highway is a section of Provincial Highway No. 9 from Taitung City to Fenggang, Pingtung County in Taiwan. The section of the highway from Taitung to Ansuo is coastal road, the rest passes through the Central Mountain Range through Shouka until reaching Fenggang at the end.

History

It was built by the Japanese government between 1933 and 1939.

Route

The length of the highway is about 90 km. This highway goes from Taitung City, and runs through Taimali, Dawu, Daren, and Shizi, and ends in Fenggang, Fangshan Township, Pingtung.

Bridges
 Jinlun Bridge

References

Highways in Taiwan